Knut Gustaf Gadd (December 4, 1916 – May 8, 1995) was a Swedish water polo player who competed in the 1948 Summer Olympics. In 1948 he was part of the Swedish team which finished fifth in the water polo tournament. He played one match.

References

1916 births
1995 deaths
Swedish male water polo players
Olympic water polo players of Sweden
Water polo players at the 1948 Summer Olympics